Hinda-Qasbah Shahi Mosque is a mosque located in the village of Hinda in Borail Union, Khetlal Upazila, Joypurhat District, Bangladesh.

History
In 1958, Abdul Khaliq Chishti established this mosque under the command of Abdul Ghafur Chishti.

See also
 List of mosques in Bangladesh

Mosques in Bangladesh
Religious buildings and structures completed in 1365
14th-century mosques